Tarkuni Punta (Aymara tarku a kind of tree; a certain bone at the neck, -ni a suffix, also spelled Tarcuni Punta) is a mountain in the Andes of Bolivia which reaches a height of approximately . It is located in the Potosí Department, Nor Chichas Province, Cotagaita Municipality.

References 

Mountains of Potosí Department